The Travelling Grave and Other Stories is a collection of horror and fantasy short stories by author L. P. Hartley. It was released in 1948 and was the author's first American collection of fantastic tales.  It was published  by Arkham House in an edition of 2,047 copies.

Most of the stories had originally appeared in two British collections:  Night Fears and The Killing Bottle and Other Stories.

Contents

The Travelling Grave and Other Stories contains the following tales:

 "A Visitor from Down Under"
 "Podolo"
 "Three, or Four, for Dinner"
 "The Travelling Grave"
 "Feet Foremost"
 "The Cotillion"
 "A Change of Ownership"
 "The Thought"
 "Conrad and the Dragon"
 "The Island"
 "Night Fears"
 "The Killing Bottle"

Reprints
London: James Barrie, 1951.
London: Hamish Hamilton, 1957.

References

1948 short story collections
Fantasy short story collections
Horror short story collections